John Malcolm Greany (April 23, 1915 – July 27, 1999) was an American nature photographer. Born in Philadelphia, Greany grew up in Detroit. In 1936 he went to Juneau, Alaska, joining Alaska explorer and promoter Bernard R. Hubbard on an expedition along the Taku River. Greany settled in Juneau in 1938 following his marriage to his wife Irene. During World War II he worked for the U.S. Army as a photographer. His photographs of the inhabitants of Attu Island in 1941 represent the last and virtually the only documentation of life on the island, since the inhabitants of Attu were deported when it was occupied by Japanese forces, and they never returned.After the war Greany worked for public agencies in Alaska and later for the U.S. Forest Service in Montana. His photographs appeared in Time and National Geographic. Greany was a friend of Ansel Adams, with whom he collaborated.

In 1974 Greany moved to Irene's hometown, Hood River, Oregon. He died on July 27, 1999 in Hood River.

References

External links

 Photographs by J. Malcolm Greany at the Alaska Digital Archives

1915 births
1999 deaths
People from Hood River, Oregon
Photographers from Oregon
Artists from Detroit